South Carolina Highway 44 may refer to:

South Carolina Highway 44 (1920s), a former state highway from west of Gourdin to Georgetown
South Carolina Highway 44 (1920s–1940s), a former state highway from Sanders Corner to Manville

044